Ravoor  is a village in the southern state of Karnataka, India. It is located in the Shahabad taluk of Kalaburagi district in Karnataka.

Demographics
 India census, Ravoor had a population of 10444 with 5375 males and 5069 females.

See also
 Gulbarga
 Districts of Karnataka

References

External links
 http://Gulbarga.nic.in/

Villages in Kalaburagi district